The list of Manitoba by-elections includes every provincial by-election held in the Canadian province of Manitoba. By-elections occur whenever there is a vacancy in the Legislative Assembly, although an imminent general election may allow the vacancy to remain until the dissolution of parliament.

Causes
A by-election occurs whenever there is a vacancy in the Manitoba Legislature. Vacancies can occur for the following reasons:

 Death of a member
 Resignation of a member
 Voided results 
 Expulsion from the legislature
 Ineligibility to sit
 Appointment to the Legislative Council, the appointed upper house of Manitoba, which was abolished in 1876.
 Appointment to the Cabinet. 
Incumbent members were required to recontest their seats upon being appointed to Cabinet; these Ministerial by-elections were almost always uncontested. This requirement was first enacted in 1872 and took effect at the 1874 general election. The requirement was clarified in 1875 to exempt ministers who resigned their offices and, within a month, accepted a new office. In 1924, members from Winnipeg—a 10-member constituency at the time—were exempted from having to seek re-election. In 1927, the remaining members were exempted from seeking reelection if they were appointed within one year of a general election. The requirement was abolished completely in 1937.

40th–42nd Legislatures (2011–present)

30th–39th Legislatures (1973–2011)

20th–29th Legislatures (1936–73)

10th–19th Legislatures (1899–1936) 

† Won by acclamation

1st–9th Legislatures (1870–96)

See also
 List of federal by-elections in Canada

Notes

References

Bibliography 
 
 
 

By-elections
 
Elections, by-elections
Manitoba, by-ele